Chris Edwards or Christopher Edwards may refer to:
 Christopher Edwards (author) (born 1954), American author
 Chris Edwards (bishop) (born 1961), Anglican bishop of North Sydney from 2013
 Chris Edwards (boxer) (1976–2018), British flyweight boxer
 Christopher Edwards (clinician) (born 1942), clinician and academic
 Christopher Edwards (cricketer) (born 1958), English cricketer
 Chris Edwards (musician) (born 1980), bassist for Kasabian
 Chris Edwards (Oregon politician) (born 1973), Oregon State House, District 14 Representative
 Chris Edwards (Nevada politician) (born 1965), member of the Nevada Assembly
 Chris Edwards (skater) (born 1973), California-based inline skater
 Sir Christopher John Churchill Edwards, 5th Baronet (born 1941), of the Edwards baronets

See also
 Christine Edwards, British film writer and producer